The first edition of the Pan Pacific Swimming Championships, a long course (50 m) event, was held in 1985 in Tokyo, Japan after discussions between Australia, United States, Canada and Japan. The inaugural event took place at the Yoyogi National Olympic Swimming Pool, from 15–18 August 1985.

Results

Men's events

Legend:

Women's events

References
Results on GBRSports.com
Results on USA Swimming

Pan Pacific Swimming Championships 
Pan Pacific Swimming Championships
Pan Pacific Swimming Championships
Pan Pacific Swimming Championships
Pan Pacific Swimming Championships
International aquatics competitions hosted by Japan
Swimming competitions in Japan